Nuestra Belleza Yucatán 2012, was held in the Salón Mérida of Centro de Convenciones Yucatán Siglo XXI in Mérida, Yucatán on June 18, 2012. At the conclusion of the final night of competition Marsha Ramírez from Mérida was crowned the winner. Ramírez was crowned by outgoing Nuestra Belleza Yucatán titleholder Jessica Duarte. Six contestants competed for the title.

Results

Placements

Judges
Ofelia Correa - Regional Coordinator of Nuestra Belleza México
Luis Moya - Dermatologist
Abril Cervera Bates - Designer

Contestants

References

External links
Official Website

Nuestra Belleza México